The process of being read into a compartmented program generally entails being approved for access to particularly sensitive and restricted information about a classified program, receiving a briefing about the program, and formally acknowledging the briefing, usually by signing a non-disclosure agreement describing restrictions on the handling and use of information concerning the program. Officials with the required security clearance and a need to know may be read into a covert operation or clandestine operation they will be working on. For codeword–classified programs, an official would not be aware a program existed with that codeword until being read in, because the codewords themselves are classified.

See also
 Sensitive Compartmented Information (SCI)
 Special access program (SAP)

References

Espionage
Classified information
National security
United States government secrecy
Military intelligence
Intelligence gathering disciplines